Nikolay Gomolko (born 18 July 1938) is a retired Russian rower who competed in the eights event at the 1960 Summer Olympics for the Soviet Union. His wife Tatyana Gomolko also competed internationally in rowing.

References

1938 births
Living people
Olympic rowers of the Soviet Union
Rowers at the 1960 Summer Olympics
Soviet male rowers
Russian male rowers